Courtis is a surname. Notable people with the surname include:

Anla Courtis (born 1972), Argentine musician, artist, composer, and sound artist
Christopher Courtis (born 1994), Barbadian swimmer
John Courtis (1902–1975), British boxer

See also
Curtis